The citrus peelminer (Marmara gulosa) is a moth of the family Gracillariidae. It is known from California, Arizona, Texas and Florida in the United States and from Cuba.

The larvae feed on Nerium oleander, Citrullus vulgaris, Prosopis, Persea americana, Gossypium hirsutum, Citrus paradisi, Salix lasiolepis and Vitis vinifera. Damage caused by citrus peelminer is apparent on the peel of the fruit and is cosmetic in nature. However, only two to three mines per fruit renders fresh-market fruit commercially unacceptable. Outbreaks in California have had devastating consequences.

Taxonomy
A Marmara species feeding on Citrus species was originally identified as Marmara salictella. Later research concluded this species is distinct. It is now known as Marmara gulosa.

References

Gracillariinae
Moths described in 2001